Friedrich Cerha (17 February 1926 – 14 February 2023) was an Austrian composer, conductor, and academic teacher. His ensemble  in Vienna was instrumental in spreading contemporary music in Austria. He composed several operas, beginning with Baal, based on Brecht's play. He is best known for completing Alban Berg's Lulu by orchestrating its unfinished third act, which premiered in Paris in 1979.

Life and career 
Cerha was born in Vienna on 17 February 1926, the son of an electrical engineer. He played the violin at age six, instructed by Anton Pejhovsky, and began composing two years later.

At 17, Cerha was drafted as a Luftwaffenhelfer in 1943, and initially served in Achau, near Vienna. During this time, he participated in a number of acts of resistance against the fascist regime. After a semester at the University of Vienna, he was sent to an officer's school in occupied Denmark. While there, he obtained a number of blank, but signed, marching order papers and deserted. These papers allowed him to remain within German territory for some time as he could use them as proof that he was supposed to be there. However, after a period, he was forced to rejoin a military unit during an advance by the Soviet forces near Pomerania. He deserted a second time and made his way to the west of Austria, where he lived in the mountains for several months to avoid capture by the Allied forces, until he was eventually able to return to Vienna in November 1945.

At the Vienna Music Academy, Cerha studied violin with Váša Příhoda, composition with Alfred Uhl, and music pedagogy. Simultaneously, he studied musicology, German culture and language, and philosophy at the University of Vienna His dissertation there, on the Turandot topic in music, was completed in 1954.

In 1958 Cerha founded the ensemble  together with Kurt Schwertsik, which was instrumental in spreading contemporary music in Austria. In addition to composing, Cerha earned a reputation as an interpreter of the works of Alban Berg, Arnold Schoenberg, and Anton Webern. This work included the completion of Alban Berg's unfinished three-act opera Lulu. Cerha orchestrated sections of the third act using Berg's notes as a reference, beginning studies of the subject in 1962. The complete three-act opera was premiered by Pierre Boulez in Paris Opéra on 24 February 1979, and directed by Patrice Chéreau. 

Alongside his career as a composer and conductor, Cerha taught at the University of Music and Performing Arts Vienna from 1959, where he was professor of composition, notation, and interpretation of new music from 1976 to 1988.

Cerha composed both orchestral works and operas. His first opera was Baal, based on Brecht's play of the same name, and influenced by Berg's Wozzeck. It was premiered at the Salzburg Festival in 1981, with performances at the Vienna State Opera and a production at the Staatsoper Berlin in 1982. It was followed by Der Rattenfänger and Der Riese vom Steinfeld, the latter commissioned by the Vienna State Opera, with a libretto by Peter Turrini, and premiered in 2002.

Cerha and his wife Gertraud, a music historian, were founding members of the Joseph Marx Society in April 2006.

Cerha died in Vienna on 14 February 2023, at age 96.

Awards 
 1964: Theodor Körner Prize
 1986: Grand Austrian State Prize for Music
 1986: Gold Medal of the Province of Styria
 1986: Honorary Medal of Vienna in gold
 1988: Honorary Member of the Vienna Konzerthaus
 2005: Austrian Decoration for Science and Art
 2006: Golden Lion of the Biennale Musica in Venice
 2007: Honorary Member of the Society of Friends of Music in Vienna
 2008: Gold Medal for services to the region of Vienna
 2010: Silver Commander's Cross of Honour for Services to the province of Lower Austria
 2011: Salzburg Music Prize
 2012: Ernst von Siemens Music Prize

Honorary doctorates 
 2017: University of Siegen

Works 
Cerha's compositions were published by Universal Edition, including:

Operas 

 Netzwerk, 1981 for singers, reciter, movement groups and orchestra
 Baal, 1974/81 – text: Bertolt Brecht
 Der Rattenfänger, 1987 – text: Carl Zuckmayer
 Completion of the opera Lulu by Alban Berg, 1962–78
 Der Riese vom Steinfeld, 2002 – text: Peter Turrini, 2002
 , 2013 – text: Peter Wolf and Cerha

Other works 

 Spiegel I, 1960 for movement groups, light objects, orchestra, and tape
 Spiegel II–VII, 1960–72
 Sinfonie, 1975
 Requiem für Hollensteiner, Text: Thomas Bernhard 1982/83, dedicated to Kurt Ohnsorg, commissioned by Austrian Musical Youth for the 25th anniversary of the Vienna Youth Choir.
 Baal-Gesänge, 1983
 Keintate I, II, 1983 ff.
 Monumentum für Karl Prantl, 1988
 Introitus and Kyrie of Requiem of Reconciliation, 1995
 Fünf Stücke for clarinet in A, cello and piano, 1999–2000
 Concerto for Soprano Saxophone and Orchestra, 2003–2004
 Violin Concerto, 2004
 Oboe Quintet, 2007
 Percussion Concerto, 2007–2008
 Like a Tragicomedy for orchestra, 2008–2009
 Bruchstück, geträumt for ensemble, 2009
 Paraphrase of the beginning of Beethoven's Symphony No. 9, 2010
 Zebra-Trio for string trio, 2011
 Tagebuch for orchestra, 2012
 Drei Sätze für Orchester, 2015
 Fasce for orchestra, before 1993
 Langegger Nachtmusiken I-III, before 1993
 Relazioni fragili for chamber ensemble, before 1993

References

Further reading

External links 
 Cerha Online Archiv der Zeitgenossen (Donau-Universität Krems) 
 Laudation for Friedrich Cerha by Karlheinz Essl (16 March 2017)
  (management)
 
 

1926 births
2023 deaths
Musicians from Vienna
Members of the European Academy of Sciences and Arts
Recipients of the Grand Austrian State Prize
Recipients of the Austrian Decoration for Science and Art
Officiers of the Ordre des Arts et des Lettres
Austrian male composers
Austrian composers
Vienna
Alumni
Male conductors (music)
Pupils of Karlheinz Stockhausen
Ernst von Siemens Music Prize winners
Theodor Körner Prize recipients
21st-century Austrian conductors (music)
20th-century Austrian composers
20th-century Austrian male musicians
21st-century male musicians
University of Music and Performing Arts Vienna alumni
Luftwaffenhelfer
German military personnel of World War II
Austrian resistance members
Deserters